Ho Kun Xian (born 15 September 1990), better known as Xian, is a Singaporean professional fighting games player. Xian is currently part of Team Razer. He was the winner of Ultra Street Fighter IV at DreamHack Winter 2015. At Capcom Cup 2015 he got third place after being eliminated by eventual runner-up Daigo Umehara. He beat Yusuke Momochi at Final Round 18. Xian plays Gen as his character of choice, as his stances allowed Xian more options. He stated that Gen was a very underestimated character that people have compared to Dan Hibiki and have easily dismissed as weak.

He won Super Street Fighter IV: Arcade Edition at EVO 2013.

Personal life
Born in 1990 to mother Lee Siew Lian, a cashier, and private-hire car driver father, Xian has an elder brother Ho An De. The whole family lives in a one-room HDB flat.

After completing his secondary school GCE Ordinary Level, Xian did odd jobs, such as cargo lifter, home mover and hawker assistant, before he enlisted for National Service. It made him realised that he was not suitable for a nine-to-five job.

In 2010, Xian met his girlfriend, Jen Tan, a tattoo artist, in an arcade who also played Street Fighter. Besides Tan, her parents are also supportive of his career.

Career
 He also derived a huge sense of satisfaction whenever he beat his friends and had carved out a name for himself.

His second-placing at the festival convinced him to start travelling to compete around the world. However, his family and friends were not supportive as it was just after his National Service and he was without a job.

In 2014, he found sponsorship in Razer Inc. which allows him to play full-time.

Now, his family and friends are supportive as he has won awards and can make a living just by gaming.

Tournament results

Street Fighter

Super Street Fighter IV: Arcade Edition (v2012)
 Shadowloo Showdown 2011 - 7th
 Canada Cup 2012 - 1st
 Red Fight District 2 - 1st
 Final Round 16 - 5th
 April Duels 2 - 1st
 Texas Showdown 2013 - 2nd
 NorCal Regionals 11 - 2nd
 Topanga Asia League - 6th
 South East Asia Major 2013 - 2nd
 Community Effort Orlando (CEO) 2013 - 1st
 Evolution 2013 - 1st
 The Fall Classic 2013 - 3rd
 Shadowloo Showdown 2013 - 7th
 ThaigerUppercut 2013 - 1st
 DreamHack Winter 2013 - 7th
 Capcom Cup 2013 - 2nd
 International Video Game Cup 2014 - 7th
 Topanga World League - 5th

Ultra Street Fighter IV
 South East Asia Major 2014 - 7th
 Capcom Pro Tour Korea - 1st
 Capcom Pro Tour Taiwan - 5th
 ThaigerUppercut 2014 - 3rd
 Capcom Pro Tour Singapore - 1st
 The Fall Classic 2014 - 2nd
 Capcom Pro Tour Asia Finals 2014 - 2nd
 Capcom Cup 2014 - 2nd
 Canada Cup Masters Series 2015 - 3rd
 SXSW Gaming Expo 2015 - 7th
 Final Round 18 - 1st
 Red Bull Kumite 2015 - 5th
 Hypespotting 4 - 5th
 Topanga World League 2 - 3rd
 Street Fridays Season 1 Finale - 4th
 South East Asia Major 2015 - 7th
 Capcom Pro Tour Asia Shanghai Qualifier - 1st
 Sino Duel - 4th
 KO Fighting Game Festival 2015 - 1st
 Milan Games Week 2015 - 2nd
 Capcom Pro Tour Asia Finals 2015 - 4th
 DreamHack Winter 2015 - 1st
 Capcom Cup 2015 - 3rd

(Ultimate) Marvel vs. Capcom 3
 Shadowloo Showdown 2011 - 4th
 April Duels 2 - 7th
 Texas Showdown 2013 - 3rd
 Shadowloo Showdown 2013 - 1st
 International Video Game Cup 2014 - 1st
 South East Asia Major 2014 - 4th
 Canada Cup Masters Series 2015 - 3rd
 Hypespotting 4 - 2nd
 Stunfest 2015 - 3rd

King of Fighters XIII
 Canada Cup 2012 - 1st
 Red Fight District 2 - 1st
 Final Round 16 - 2nd
 April Duels 2 - 3rd
 Texas Showdown 2013 - 1st
 South East Asia Major 2013 - 3rd
 Community Effort Orlando (2013) - 4th
 Evolution 2015 - 5th
 The Fall Classic 2013 - 1st
 Shadowloo Showdown 2013 - 1st
 South East Asia Major 2014 - 2nd
 ThaigerUppercut 2014 - 1st
 The Fall Classic 2014 - 1st
 Final Round 18 - 2nd

Street Fighter V
 Stunfest 2016 - 5th
 EVO 2016 -  9-12th
 Final Round 20 - 1st

Pop culture
Xian was notably among the people who reacted negatively about Konami's upcoming game Metal Gear Survive during the game's debut trailer at Gamescom 2016. He said that he was speechless and felt that Metal Gear Solid and Zombies together would be weird while including a #why hashtag at the end of the tweet.

In the media
In 2017, Xian was featured in the Channel NewsAsia series, Unusual Suspects, about Singaporeans who have made their mark in unconventional fields. He appeared in Unusual Suspects: The Underdogs which was aired on 7 October 2017.

References

External links
 Twitter account

1990 births
Living people
Singaporean esports players
Fighting game players
Team Razer players
Street Fighter players
Marvel vs. Capcom players